San Mateo is a city in the
state of Aragua in Venezuela. It is the administrative seat of Bolívar Municipality. It was founded on 30 November 1620.

San Mateo has a former cane sugar mill, Ingenio Bolívar, now a museum.

Cities in Aragua
Populated places established in 1620
1620 establishments in the Spanish Empire